Forbes's mannikin (Lonchura forbesi) or the New Ireland munia, is a species of estrildid finch breeding in Papua New Guinea. It has an estimated global extent of occurrence of 20,000 to 50,000 km2. It is found in subtropical or tropical lowland dry grassland habitat. The status of the species is evaluated as Least Concern.

References

BirdLife Species Factsheet

Forbes's mannikin
Birds of New Ireland Province
Forbes's mannikin
Forbes's mannikin